The frequency domain decomposition (FDD) is an output-only system identification technique popular in civil engineering, in particular in structural health monitoring.  As an output-only algorithm, it is useful when the input data is unknown.  FDD is a modal analysis technique which generates a system realization using the frequency response given (multi-)output data.

Algorithm 
 Estimate the power spectral density matrix  at discrete frequencies .
 Do a singular value decomposition of the power spectral density, i.e.  where  is a unitary matrix holding the singular values ,  is the diagonal matrix holding the singular values .
 For an  degree of freedom system, then pick the  dominating peaks in the power spectral density using whichever technique you wish (or manually).  These peaks correspond to the mode shapes.
 Using the mode shapes, an input-output system realization can be written.

See also 
 Eigensystem realization algorithm - an input/output identification technique

References 

Systems theory